The Addu Football Stadium is a sporting stadium in Addu City, Maldives. The stadium went through renovations in 2014 for the hosting of some matches of the 2014 AFC Challenge Cup.

References

Football venues in the Maldives